The 1996–97 FIBA Korać Cup was the 26th edition of FIBA's Korać Cup basketball competition. The Greek Aris defeated the Turkish Tofaş in the final.

Team allocation

Country ranking
For the 1996–1997 FIBA Korać Cup, the countries are allocated places according to their place on the FIBA country rankings, which takes into account their performance in European competitions from 1993–94 to 1995–96.

Teams
The labels in the parentheses show how each team qualified for the place of its starting round:

 1st, 2nd, 3rd, etc.: League position after Playoffs
 WC: Wild card

Qualifying round

|}

Regular season

Source:

Round of 32

|}

Round of 16

|}

Quarterfinals

|}

Semifinals

|}

Finals

|}

See also 
 1996–97 FIBA EuroLeague
 1996–97 FIBA EuroCup

References

External links
Official website
Linguasport.com 1996–97 FIBA Korać Cup
Pearlbasket.org 1996–97 FIBA Korać Cup

1996–97
1996–97 in European basketball